Marcgravia crassiflora is a species of flowering plant in the Marcgraviaceae family. It is endemic to Ecuador.

Ecology
The plant's natural habitat is subtropical or tropical moist montane areas of the Andes local ranges.

The green-crowned brilliant hummingbird feeds at the large inflorescences of the Marcgravia crassiflora vines.

References

crassiflora
Endemic flora of Ecuador
Flora of the Andes
Data deficient plants
Bird food plants
Vines
Taxonomy articles created by Polbot